The following table indicates the parties of elected officials in the U.S. state of Alaska:
 Governor, including pre-statehood governors, who were appointed by the U.S. president and usually of the same political party;  and
 Lieutenant Governor

The table also indicates the historical party composition in the:
 Territorial and State Senate
 Territorial and State House of Representatives
 State delegation to the United States Senate
 State delegation to the United States House of Representatives, including non-voting delegates elected pre-statehood

For years in which a United States presidential election was held, the table indicates which party's nominees received the state's electoral votes.

Pre-statehood (1884–1958)

1959–present

Notes

See also 
 Law and government in Alaska
 Elections in Alaska
 Government of Alaska
 Politics of Alaska

References

External links 
 

Politics of Alaska
Alaska